Kugarchino (Kügärsen) is a rural locality (a village) in Bolshekachakovsky Selsoviet, Kaltasinsky District, Bashkortostan, Russia. The population was 178 as of 2010. There are 7 streets.

Geography 
Babayevo is the nearest rural locality.

References 

Rural localities in Kaltasinsky District